Burlova is a rural locality (a village) in Leninskoye Rural Settlement, Kudymkarsky District, Perm Krai, Russia. The population was 10 as of 2010.

Geography 
Burlova is located 25 km south of Kudymkar (the district's administrative centre) by road. Sidorshor is the nearest rural locality.

References 

Rural localities in Kudymkarsky District